Ekho Mountain is a mountain,  high, standing  southwest of Vorposten Peak in the Lomonosov Mountains, Queen Maud Land. It was discovered and roughly plotted from air photos by the Third German Antarctic Expedition, 1938–39. It was mapped from air photos and surveys by the Sixth Norwegian Antarctic Expedition, 1958–59, was remapped by the Soviet Antarctic Expedition, 1960–61, and named "Gora Ekho" ("Echo Mountain").

References 

Mountains of Queen Maud Land
Princess Astrid Coast